The 2018 Sochi GP3 Series round was the eighth And penultimate round of the 2018 GP3 Series. It was held on 29 and 30 September 2018 at Sochi Autodrom in Sochi, Russia. The race supported the 2018 Russian Grand Prix.

Classification

Qualifying 

 Nikita Mazepin recorded the fastest time in qualifying, but was penalised for leaving the circuit limits and gaining an advantage.

Race 1

Race 2

Notes

References

|- style="text-align:center"
|width="35%"|Previous race:
|width="30%"|GP3 Series2018 season
|width="40%"|Next race:

Sochi
GP3
GP3 Sochi